Keith W. Pelley (born 1964) is a sports executive who is the CEO of the PGA European Tour. He has been the president of Rogers Media, team president of the Toronto Argonauts and the president of The Sports Network (TSN).

Biography

Early life
Pelley grew up in Etobicoke, a suburb of Toronto, Ontario. He was a student at Martingrove Collegiate Institute, where he also played as a running back in the Etobicoke Minor Football League. After graduation, he first went on to study at Trinity College London. He then returned to Canada, attending the Radio and Television Arts Program (RTA) at Ryerson Polytechnical Institute (now Toronto Metropolitan University).

During his Ryerson studies, he did television reporting for the station that eventually became Omni Television, worked for the City TV network with sportscasterPete Gross, and worked as an assistant editor for SportsCentre with TSN.

Sports Executive
After graduating from Ryerson, Pelley worked in several different positions at TSN, beginning with his assistant editor post (which he started while completing his schooling at Ryerson), eventually becoming the President of the company.

In the early 2000s, he was asked by the then-owners of the Toronto Argonauts, Howard Sokolowski and David Cynamon, to become the Team President and Chief Executive Officer of the Canadian Football League team (succeeding Dan Ferrone). He accepted the position in 2003, and was made CEO in 2004. During his time as Team President, the Argonauts won the 92nd Grey Cup, their first CFL championship in seven years. Pelley left the Argonauts in 2007, and was replaced by joint team presidents Pinball Clemons and Brad Watters.

From 2007 to 2010, he was the President of Canada’s Olympic broadcast media consortium for the 2010 Winter Olympics in Vancouver while employed as the Executive Vice President of Strategic Planning at the CTV Television Network.

On 7 September 2010, he became the president of Rogers Media, a subsidiary of Rogers Communications.

PGA European Tour
On 17 April 2015, he resigned as the president of Rogers Media to become the Commissioner and Chief Executive Officer of the PGA European Tour.

See also
 Rogers Media
 Toronto Argonauts
 PGA European Tour

References

External links
 PGA European Tour

1964 births
Living people
Businesspeople from Toronto
Sportspeople from Etobicoke
Toronto Argonauts team presidents
Toronto Metropolitan University alumni